Maiha is a town and Local Government Area of Adamawa State, Nigeria, adjacent to the border with Cameroon.

Local Government Areas in Adamawa State